This is a list of official U.S. state foods:

Notes

See also
 List of U.S. state beverages

References

External links
 The Food Timeline: State Foods and Recipes
 NetState: All states symbols

State Foods
Foods